Tan Sri Datuk Seri Ahmad Fuad bin Ismail (born 16 July 1953) was the 9th mayor of Kuala Lumpur. He took office from 14 December 2007 to 12 July 2013.

Honour

Honour of Malaysia
  : 
 Member of the Order of the Defender of the Realm (A.M.N.) (1990)
 Commander of the Order of Loyalty to the Crown of Malaysia (P.S.M.) - Tan Sri (2010)

 Knight Companion of the Order of Sultan Sharafuddin Idris Shah (D.S.I.S.) - Dato’ (2002)

 Officer of the Order of the Defender of State (D.S.P.N.) - Dato’ (2005)

 Knight Companion of the Order of Loyalty to the Royal House of Kedah (D.S.D.K.) - Dato’ (2008)

 Grand Commander of the Order of the Territorial Crown (S.M.W.) - Datuk Seri (2010)

References 

Mayors of Kuala Lumpur
Living people
1953 births
Members of the Order of the Defender of the Realm
Commanders of the Order of Loyalty to the Crown of Malaysia